Kuwait Joint League is a League system tournament were all teams compete in and was defunct in 1988-89 Kuwait SC final champion.

Champions
1969–70: Al Arabi SC
1970–71: Al Arabi SC
1971–72: Al Arabi SC
1972–73: Al-Yarmouk SC
1973–74: Al-Yarmouk SC
1976–77: Kuwait SC
1984–85: Al Arabi SC
1987–88: Al Arabi SC
1988–89: Kuwait SC

External links

Joint
Sports leagues established in 1969
Defunct football competitions in Kuwait
1969 establishments in Kuwait
1989 disestablishments in Kuwait